Josh Sugarmann is an American activist for gun control in the United States. He is the executive director and founder of the Violence Policy Center (VPC), a non-profit advocacy and educational organization, and the author of two books on gun control. He has written a blog on these issues for the Huffington Post and publishes opinion pieces in the media.

Early life
Sugarmann grew up in Newtown, Connecticut, graduating in the high school class of 1978. He graduated from Boston University with a degree in journalism. He moved to Washington, D.C., where he became engaged in public interest activities, serving as a press officer in the national office of Amnesty International USA and as the communications director for the National Coalition to Ban Handguns (now known as the Coalition to Stop Gun Violence).

Career
In 1988 Sugarmann founded the Violence Policy Center, a 501(c3) gun control advocacy and educational group based in Washington, D.C. The Violence Policy Center is known mainly for its in-depth research on the firearms industry, the causes and effects of gun violence, and recommendations for regulatory policies to reduce gun violence.

Sugarmann has opposed the widespread availability of semi-automatic rifles. In 1988 he published a study, Assault Weapons and Accessories in America. It examined the growing popularity of semiautomatic firearms, referring to them as "assault weapons". Together with the response to a mass shooting in Stockton, California, the following year, his study has been credited for popularizing the use of the term "assault weapons." The study documents advertising by the gun industry that specifically refers to these weapons as assault rifles.

Sugarmann has written two books on gun control. National Rifle Association: Money, Firepower & Fear (1992) was an exposé of the National Rifle Association. The second, Every Handgun is Aimed at You: The Case for Banning Handguns (2000), gives reasons to ban private possession of handguns in the United States.

He maintains a Class One Federal Firearms License in Washington, D.C., which makes it legal for him to transfer and handle firearms.  Sugarmann believes a full ban on handguns is necessary. He has also called for bans on semi-automatic rifles and firearm magazines with a capacity of more than 10 rounds.

References

External links

Josh Sugarmann's blogs on the Huffington Post 
Josh Sugarmann, "The Price of Freedom: More Bodies", First Monday, 23 May 2005, Iowans for the Prevention of Gun Violence
"The Brady Bill won't break the sick hold guns have on America. It's time for tougher measures.", Mother Jones, January 1994

Living people
American gun control activists
Gun violence researchers
Boston University College of Communication alumni
Year of birth missing (living people)